Chireno Independent School District is a public school district based in Chireno, Texas (USA).

The district is located in east central Nacogdoches County and extends into a small portion of San Augustine County.

Chireno ISD has two campuses: Chireno Jr High and High School (Grades 9–12) and Chireno Elementary (Grades PK–8).

In 2009, the school district was rated "recognized" by the Texas Education Agency.

References

External links
Chireno ISD

School districts in Nacogdoches County, Texas
School districts in San Augustine County, Texas